Fountaintown is an unincorporated community in Van Buren Township, Shelby County, in the U.S. state of Indiana.

History
Fountaintown was laid out in 1854 by Matthew Fountain, and named for him. The railroad was extended to Fountaintown in 1867. The post office at Fountaintown has been in operation since 1869.

Fountaintown had its own high school in the early half of the 20th century.

Geography

References

Unincorporated communities in Shelby County, Indiana
Unincorporated communities in Indiana
Indianapolis metropolitan area
1854 establishments in Indiana
Populated places established in 1854